Ilya Nikolayevich Berezin (20 July 1818, Yug, Permsky Uyezd,  Perm Governorate, Russian Empire,— 3 April 1896, Saint Petersburg, Russian Empire) was a prominent Russian Orientalist, the major authority on the culture, languages and history of Turkey, Iran and Mongolia, the Meritorious Professor of Saint Petersburg University, who wrote both in Russian and French.

Among his acclaimed works written in Russian were The Library of Oriental Historians (Библиотека восточных историков, 1850—1851, 2 volumes), Travelling the East (Путешествия по Востоку, 1849—1852, 2 volumes). The East Turkey Library (Библиотека восточных турков, 1849—1854, 3 volumes), The Turkish Reader (Турецкая хрестоматия, 1857—1878, 3 volumes). His French-language works include Recherches sur les dialectes persans (1853), Catalogue des mémoires et des médailles du cabinet numismatique de l’université de Casan (1855), Guide du voyageur en Orient. Dialogues arabes d’après trois principaux dialectes: de Mésopotamie, de Syrie et d'Egypte (1857). In 1872—1882 Ilya Berezin edited the Russian Encyclopedian Dictionary in 16 volumes.

He was the recipient of high-profile awards, including the Orders of St. Anna (1st class), St. Stanislaus {1st class) and St. Vladimir (3rd class).

References

1818 births
1896 deaths
People from Perm Krai
People from Permsky Uyezd
Historians from the Russian Empire
Philologists from the Russian Empire
Translators from the Russian Empire
Orientalists from the Russian Empire
Kurdologists
Kazan Federal University alumni
Academic staff of Saint Petersburg State University
Recipients of the Order of St. Anna, 1st class
Recipients of the Order of Saint Stanislaus (Russian), 1st class
Recipients of the Order of St. Vladimir, 3rd class
Burials at Novodevichy Cemetery (Saint Petersburg)
Privy Councillor (Russian Empire)